The 2011 Marshall Thundering Herd football team represented Marshall University in the 2011 NCAA Division I FBS football season. The Thundering Herd were led by second-year head coach Doc Holliday and played their home games at Joan C. Edwards Stadium. They are a member of the East Division of Conference USA. They finished the season 7–6, 5–3 in C-USA to finish in second place in the East Division. They were invited to the Beef 'O' Brady's Bowl where they defeated FIU 20–10.

Previous season
In the 2010 season under first year head coach Doc Holliday, the Thundering Herd finished with an overall record of 5–7 and 4–4 within Conference USA. After starting the season 1–6, Marshall won four of the last five games. They missed playing in a bowl game for the first time since 2008.

Schedule

Game summaries

West Virginia

The Herd again fell to The Mountaineers in a game that was delayed a total of 4 hours, 22 minutes and called with 14:36 left in the 4th quarter.  Following 3rd a quarter Tavon Austin kickoff return for a TD that gave the Mountaineers a 27–13 lead with 5 minutes to play in the 3rd quarter the game experienced a lightning delay that lasted 3 hours, 6 minutes.  Once resuming play a Vernard Roberts 1 Yd Run extended the WVU lead to 34–13 early in the 4th quarter, after which the game was once again delayed for lightning.  It was ultimately agreed to by both teams to end the game.

Southern Miss

Rakeem Cato threw three touchdown passes to rally Marshall in a 26–20 win over Southern Mississippi in the Conference USA opener for both teams.
The Thundering Herd trailed 17–3 with 5:30 left in the second quarter before Cato orchestrated three straight touchdown drives. His third straight score, a 17-yard pass to Aaron Dobson, gave Marshall a 24–17 lead with 1:19 remaining in the third quarter. Cato finished with 275 yards and two interceptions on 27-of-42 passing. Southern Miss QB Austin Davis broke Brett Favre's career passing mark. Davis needed 74 yards coming in, broke the record of 7,695 set from 1987–1990.

External link: http://scores.espn.go.com/ncf/recap?gameId=312530276

Ohio

Tyler Tettleton threw for three touchdowns and ran for another, leading Ohio over Marshall 44–7 to cement the Bobcats' best start in 35 years. Tettleton was 20 of 29 for 285 yards and also rushed for 53 yards on nine carries for the Bobcats, who have won their first three games of the season for the first time since 1976. Ryan Boykin had 130 yards rushing with a touchdown on 25 carries, and caught two passes for 20 yards for Ohio. Rakeem Cato threw for 116 yards, one touchdown and four interceptions for the Thundering Herd.

External link: http://espn.go.com/ncf/recap?gameId=312600195

Virginia Tech

David Wilson rushed for 132 yards, Josh Oglesby scored two touchdowns and No. 13 Virginia Tech improved to 4–0 for the first time since 2006 with a 30–10 win over Marshall. The day started poignantly for Frank Beamer, who laid a memorial stone at the Marshall University Memorial to the 75 players, coaches and members of the university community killed in a 1970 plane crash about 2½ hours before the game. Two of the coaches killed in the crash – coach Rick Tolley and assistant coach Frank Loria – were Virginia Tech graduates and Loria and Beamer played together in the Hokies secondary in the mid-1960s.

External link: http://espn.go.com/ncf/recap?gameId=312670276

Louisville

Rakeem Cato's 4-yard touchdown pass to C.J. Crawford put Marshall ahead with less than two minutes left in the fourth quarter and the Thundering Herd held on to beat Louisville 17–13. Omar Brown helped seal the victory with an interception of Teddy Bridgewater's pass on the second play of the ensuing drive. The ball was tipped in the air by teammate Darryl Roberts and Brown dove forward along the sideline, cradling the ball against his chest before it reached the ground. This was Marshall's first win over a BCS school since 2003.

External link: http://espn.go.com/ncf/recap?gameId=312740097

Central Florida

Central Florida running back Brynn Harvey rushed 30 times for 180 yards and quarterback Jeff Godfrey threw his first passing touchdown of the season as the Knights held on to beat Marshall. Marshall came in with much momentum after an upset win over Louisville the previous week, but struggled to find its offensive footing in steady rainfall throughout the game. The win ended a two-game losing skid for UCF and gave coach George O'Leary his 100th career victory.

External link: http://espn.go.com/ncf/recap?gameId=312812116

Rice

Tron Martinez scored on a 4-yard run with 1:48 to play to lift Marshall to a 24–20 win over Rice. Marshall trailed 20–17 when it recovered a Rice fumble at the Owls' 23-yard-line with 3:31 remaining in the game. Six plays later, Martinez scored the game-winning touchdown. A.J. Graham rushed for 129 yards and two touchdowns as the Thundering Herd gained 217 yards on the ground.

External link: http://espn.go.com/ncf/recap?gameId=312880276

Houston

Case Keenum became the Football Bowl Subdivision's career leader in total offense, throwing for 376 yards and tying his career high with six touchdown passes as Houston beat Marshall 63–28. The senior quarterback needed 130 yards to eclipse the record (16,910 yards) set by Hawaii's Timmy Chang from 2000–04. He moved past Chang on a 30-yard pass to Justin Johnson with 3:56 left in the first quarter. A.J. Graham threw two touchdown passes and ran for a score for Marshall, which lost handily despite gaining 506 yards and winning possession time by 24 minutes.

External link: http://espn.go.com/ncf/recap?gameId=312950248

UAB

A.J. Graham passed for four of his five touchdowns in the first half and Marshall dominated from the start in a 59–14 rout over Alabama-Birmingham. Graham, who completed 19 of 27 passes, threw for 239 yards and had one interception in just his third career start for the Thundering Herd. Marshall never trailed against UAB, who struggled to keep pace as Marshall held the Blazers scoreless in the first half. Other than Graham's first-half passing scores, Marshall had another highlight from Omar Brown, who returned an interception 48-yards for a touchdown to give it a 24–0 lead in the second quarter.

External link: http://espn.go.com/ncf/recap?gameId=313020276

Tulsa

Marshall and Tulsa last met in 2008 at Huntington in a game won by Tulsa 38–35. Marshall is 0–2 all time against Tulsa.

Memphis

Marshall and Memphis last met in 2010 at Huntington in a game won by Marshall 28–13. Marshall is 4–2 all time against Memphis. This year's game will be played on a Thursday.

East Carolina

Marshall and East Carolina last met in 2010 at Greenville in a game won by East Carolina 37–10. Marshall is 3–9 all time against ECU. Because both teams are 5–6, the winner of the matchup will receive bowl eligibility, while the loser will not.

FIU (Beef 'O' Brady's Bowl)

Marshall has a 6–2 record in bowl games, with the last one at the 2009 Little Caesars Pizza Bowl defeating Ohio, 21–17. Defensively, Marshall is tied for fifth nationally in tackles for loss (95), and is tied for 15th in fumbles recovered (14). Nationally, Vinny Curry is tied for third with six forced fumbles and is also second on in tackles for loss (21) and is sixth in sacks (11.0). George Carpenter has three fumble recoveries which places him tie for 12th place.

References

Marshall
Marshall Thundering Herd football seasons
Gasparilla Bowl champion seasons
Marshall Thundering Herd football